Harker Creek is a stream located in Iowa County, Wisconsin. It drains into Flint Creek at its northern end at 248 m (814 ft) above sea level. The lower portion of the creek is paralleled by Mount Hope Road and Berg Road. Lee Creek drains into Harker Creek at 255 m (838 ft) elevation. The upper portion of Harker Creek is surrounded by steep hills that extend as high as 30 m (100 ft) above the creek. At its highest point, the creek is at approximately 390 m (1280 ft) elevation. The southernmost reentrants of the creek are within 400 m (1300 ft) of U.S. Route 18.

References

Water Action Volunteers (2003).  Citizen Stream Monitoring Data Summary.  Retrieved Aug. 15, 2006.

External links
 Harker Creek water conditions - Water Action Volunteers Citizen Monitoring Database

Rivers of Iowa County, Wisconsin
Rivers of Wisconsin